Tilak Ratnayake was the 2nd Governor of Uva. He was appointed in February 1990 succeeding P. C. Imbulana and was Governor until March 1993. He was succeeded by Abeyratne Pilapitiya.

References

Governors of Uva Province
Mayors of Kandy